Bowie High School may refer to:

Bowie High School (Arizona) in Bowie, Arizona
Bowie High School (Maryland) in Bowie, Maryland
Bowie High School (Arlington, Texas) in Arlington, Texas
Bowie High School (Austin, Texas) in Austin, Texas
Bowie High School (El Paso, Texas) in El Paso, Texas
Bowie High School (Bowie, Texas) in Bowie, Texas

See also
 James Bowie High School (disambiguation)